Pseudodaphnella hadfieldi is a species of sea snail, a marine gastropod mollusk in the family Raphitomidae.

Description
The length of the shell attains 6 mm, its diameter 3 mm.

The white fusiform shell is wrinkled. It contains seven whorls with a few longitudinal ribs. These ribs are pronounced and ventricose. They are alternately squarrosely ochre-colored. The aperture is subrotund. The outer lip is incrassate and denticulate within. The columella is simple and slightly blistered on the outside.

Distribution
This marine species occurs off the Loyalty Islands, Indonesia, New Caledonia, Palau

References

External links
 Kilburn, R. N. (2009). Genus Kermia (Mollusca: Gastropoda: Conoidea: Conidae: Raphitominae) in South African Waters, with Observations on the Identities of Related Extralimital Species. African Invertebrates. 50(2): 217-236.
  edosov A. E. & Puillandre N. (2012) Phylogeny and taxonomy of the Kermia–Pseudodaphnella (Mollusca: Gastropoda: Raphitomidae) genus complex: a remarkable radiation via diversification of larval development. Systematics and Biodiversity 10(4): 447-477
 
 MNHN, Paris: syntype

ephela
Gastropods described in 1895